Take a Walk on the Wildside is a 2017 Canadian documentary film directed by Lisa Rideout. The film profiles Take a Walk on the Wildside, a clothing store in Toronto, Ontario which caters to the unique needs of cross-dressing men.

The film premiered at the Hot Docs Canadian International Documentary Festival in 2017.

The film won the Canadian Screen Award for Best Short Documentary Film at the 6th Canadian Screen Awards.

References

External links
 

2017 films
2017 short documentary films
Canadian short documentary films
Canadian LGBT-related short films
2017 LGBT-related films
Documentary films about cross-dressing
Best Short Documentary Film Genie and Canadian Screen Award winners
2010s English-language films
2010s Canadian films